Dame Christina Caroline Lambert DBE, styled Mrs Justice Lambert is a British High Court judge.

Early life and education 
Lambert was born on August 15, 1963, in Newcastle upon Tyne. She attended Central Newcastle High School for Girls. She studied history at Emmanuel College, Cambridge, and law at City University, London.

After graduating, Lambert worked at the Peggy Guggenheim Collection in Venice.

Career 
Before completing her Bar training course, in 1988 Lambert was awarded a grant by the Inner Temple of £3.500 and a Yarbrough-Anderson scholarship of £300 in August 1988. (£ in 2019).

After completing her Pupillage, Lambert was called to the Bar by Inner Temple in 1988 and began her tenancy at '6 Pump Court' chambers. She later moved to '1 Crown Office Row' where she remained until taking up office. She was appointed King's Counsel in 2009.

In 2012 Lambert was appointed as Lead Counsel to the Dame Janet Smith Review into the culture and practices of the BBC relating to the sexual abuse of Jimmy Savile. Between 2014 and 2016, Lambert acted as lead counsel for the coroner in the Hillsborough disaster inquest. She remarked that the inquest as the most memorable moment in her career.“During my questioning of the match commander, David Duckenfield, he admitted that he lied about fans forcing the exit gate to gain entry to the stadium: the court — packed with the relatives of those who died — fell completely silent.”

High Court appointment 
Lambert was appointed as a High Court judge on the 11th of January 2018 and assigned to the Kings Bench Division by the Lord Chief Justice. In May 2019, She received the customary title of Dame Commander of the British Empire from Queen Elizabeth II at St James's Palace. She is an honorary fellow of Emmanuel College, Cambridge.

Notable cases 
Lambert presided over the trial of Savannah Brockhill and Frankie Smith, for the murder of Star Hobson.

Further reading 

 2019 Special Honours
 High Court - Courts and Tribunals Judiciary
 List of Dames Commander of the Order of the British Empire

References 

1963 births
Living people
High Court judges (England and Wales)
Officers of the Order of the British Empire
Alumni of Emmanuel College, Cambridge
Alumni of City, University of London
People educated at Central Newcastle High School